Artane may refer to:

 Artane, Dublin, a suburb of Dublin, Ireland
 Artane Industrial School, a former industrial school
 Artane Band, a marching band
 Dublin Artane (Dáil constituency), a former electoral division 
 Trihexyphenidyl, a drug used to treat Parkinson's disease with a brand-name Artane
 Artanë, a town and municipality in Kosovo
 Artane Rizvanolli (born 1984), economy minister of Kosovo

See also
 Artana (disambiguation)
 Artanes (disambiguation)